Calvin Tang is founder of social news media web site Newsvine.com, located in Seattle, Washington.  Newsvine, Inc. was acquired by NBCNews.com in 2007, for an undisclosed sum.  Following the acquisition, Newsvine eventually came to power many of the interactive and social features across the NBC News Digital Network, including the web properties of brands such as NBC Nightly News, TODAY Show, The Rachel Maddow Show and others.  Tang served as Chief Operating Officer of Newsvine from 2005 to 2010.

Background 

Tang graduated in 2000 from Seattle University with a Bachelor of Science degree with emphasis in Premedical Sciences.  He is an underwater photographer, and formerly served as a photojournalist and contributing writer for a Bangkok-based magazine, Untamed Travel.  Tang has been involved in a number of business ventures relating to real estate development, news media, technology, sourcing and manufacturing, mobile payments, entertainment and hospitality.  Tang was certified by the Northwest Avalanche Institute as a helicopter ski guide, is a divemaster, technical closed circuit rebreather diver, and was once internationally recognized as a professional DJ.

During the second half of 2010, Tang launched AtlasOmega, an online magazine that features stories about modern day exploration, adventure travel and photography.  He also publishes a hyper-local photography blog, Three Blocks, which pertains to the Pike Place Market and Belltown neighborhoods in Seattle, Washington. In 2013, Tang began publishing his photography-related work to a portfolio-style website, Tangfish.com.

Tang is the founder and operator of Northwest Dive Club, an organization that serves several thousand members.  The members are primarily located in Washington State, Oregon, and Alaska, and range from being recreational SCUBA diving enthusiasts to professional divers and dive industry business operators.  Tang is also a contributor to and supporter of the Raja Ampat Sea Centre, a conservation initiative whose mission it is to protect and conserve the pristine nature and marine biodiversity that exists within Raja Ampat, a region in the heart of the Coral Triangle. 

Tang is also the managing member of Tang Holdings, LLC, a firm with diversified assets in real estate, technology, alternative energy, and other investments.  He is also a member of the Bellevue Business Roundtable (an organization with ties to the original business owners of the City of Bellevue, WA) and the Asian American Journalists Association.

External links
Tangfish.com
AtlasOmega
Newsvine
Raja Ampat Sea Centre
Three Blocks
Northwest Dive Club 
Untamed Travel 
CalvinTang.com 
Swivel Latch

Interviews of Calvin Tang
Asian American Journalists Association profile of Calvin Tang's most recent venture, AtlasOmega
USC Annenberg - Online Journalism Review Interviews Calvin Tang
Folksonomy.org Interviews Calvin Tang
nPost Interviews Calvin Tang
Interview with Calvin Tang, co-founder of Newsvine.com. - small WORLD Podcast
Puget Sound Business Journal Interviews Calvin Tang
Seattle University Interview of Calvin Tang

American businesspeople
American bloggers
Seattle University alumni
Living people
Year of birth missing (living people)